Colindres is a Spanish habitational surname. It originates from the town of Colindres in modern day Cantabria, Spain

Notable people with the surname include:

 Daniel Colindres (born 1985), Costa Rican professional footballer 
 Verónica Colindres (born 1986), female Salvadoran race walker
 Vicente Mejía Colindres (1878–1966), President of Honduras between 16 September and 5 October 1919

References

Spanish toponymic surnames